Nissan Yigal Guetta (born 18 March 1966) is an Israeli politician who served as a member of the Knesset for Shas between 2016 and 2017.

Early life
Guetta was born and raised in Kiryat Shmona, where his brother and sister-in-law were killed in the Kiryat Shmona massacre in 1974. He carried out his IDF national service in the Nahal. He was educated at Bais Hatalmud in Jerusalem, and gained a master's degree in business and public administration from Ono Academic College.

Municipal politics
In 2003, he was elected to Bnei Brak City Council on the Shas list, becoming responsible for its finance portfolio. In 2008, he was appointed CEO of the municipality of El'ad. In 2010, after alleging corruption on the part of the mayor, he was fired. He returned to work, however, after the State Comptroller Micha Lindenstrauss issued a temporary decree. Lindenstrauss ordered Guetta to leave his position six months later, once the decree expired.

Knesset member
Guetta was placed tenth on the Shas list for the 2015 Knesset elections, but failed to become a Knesset member when Shas won seven seats. In January 2016, he entered the Knesset after Deputy Minister of the Interior Meshulam Nahari resigned as an MK under the Norwegian Law. In September 2017, Guetta revealed on Army Radio that he had attended the same-sex marriage ceremony of his nephew two years earlier. Later that month, he resigned from the Knesset under pressure from rabbis. Guetta did receive support from several Shas MKs, as well as MKs from other parties including Yair Lapid and Merav Michaeli. His seat was taken by Danny Saida.

Broadcasting career
In January 2018, he began presenting a radio show on the Israel Broadcasting Corporation. In May 2019, he began starring in an investigative television series with a focus on socio-economic inequality, also on the Israel Broadcasting Corporation, titled Citizen Guetta.

Personal life
Guetta is married, with three children. His eldest daughter, Simcha Guetta, is a model and reality television star. He lives in the Pardes Katz neighbourhood of Bnei Brak.

References

External links

1966 births
Living people
People from Kiryat Shmona
Members of the 20th Knesset (2015–2019)
Shas politicians
People from Bnei Brak
Ono Academic College alumni